The following are the national records in Olympic weightlifting in Kenya. Records are maintained in each weight class for the snatch lift, clean and jerk lift, and the total for both lifts by the Kenya Amateur Weightlifting Association.

Current records

Men

Women

References

Kenya
weightlifting
weightlifting